Keith Tucker (born 25 November 1936) is an English former professional footballer who played in the Football League, as a left back.

External links
Profile at ENFA

1936 births
Living people
People from Deal, Kent
Footballers from Kent
English footballers
Association football defenders
Charlton Athletic F.C. players
Wigan Athletic F.C. players
English Football League players